St. Nshan or Hazarabyurats Monastery was a ruinous Armenian monastery located near the village of Kuku (Shahbuz District) of the Nakhchivan Autonomous Republic of Azerbaijan. It was located on the slope of a hill, approximately 700m north of the village.

History 
The monastery was founded in the middle of the 13th century and was renovated in the 15th and 17th centuries.

Architecture 
The monastery was a domed structure with three apses, four vestries, and a doorway on the west that opened onto a porch. There were Armenian inscriptions on the interior. A vaulted structured to the west of the church was probably serving as a library.

Destruction 
The monastery complex was in ruins in the late Soviet period. The ruinous complex was in the process of further destruction in May 2003 and it was completely erased by April 26, 2009, as documented by Caucasus Heritage Watch.

References 

Armenian churches in Azerbaijan
Ruins in Azerbaijan